The National University (NU), colloquially National U, is a private non–sectarian coeducational university located in Sampaloc, Manila, Philippines. The founder of the university, Mariano F. Jhocson Sr., established the institution on August 1, 1900, as Colegio Filipino in Quiapo, Manila. It is considered as the first private nonsectarian and coeducational institution in the Philippines and also, the first university to use English as its medium of instruction, replacing Spanish.

With its main campus in Sampaloc, Manila, the university has been expanding by setting secondary campuses. Other campuses of NU includes: NU Laguna (Sports Academy), NU Fairview, NU Mall of Asia (College of Dentistry), NU Baliwag, NU Dasmariñas, and NU Lipa.

Approved by the Department Public Instruction on June 17, 1921, the university received its university status, changing the name from National Academy to National University. Senator Camilo Osías, two-time Senate President of the Philippines, served as the first University President (1921-1936). The current university president is Renato C. Ermita, Jr. (2008–present) and its current majority owner is the SM Group.

NU is one of the pioneer members of National Collegiate Athletic Association- Philippines (NCAA) and the University Athletic Association of the Philippines (UAAP), and also a pioneer member of the Philippine Association of Colleges and Universities (PACU). Its international affiliations and memberships include the Association of Southeast Asian Institutions of Higher Learning (ASAHIL) and the International Association of Universities (IAU).

History 

Mariano F. Jhocson Sr. founded Colegio Filipino on August 1, 1900, Jhocson Residence in Palma Street, Quiapo, Manila. Only a handful of students at that time were enrolled in the fledgling school and they were in the elementary and secondary levels. Mariano Sr. served as the college director, instructor, and janitor. He began business courses in bookkeeping and accounting. This prompted a name change as it became known as Colegio Mercantil, awarding the diploma of Perito Mercantil. A short time later, Jhocson Sr. collaborated with attorneys Simeon C. Lacson and Ricardo C. Lacson and established the Philippine Law School. From Colegio Mercantil, the Board of Trustees changed the name of the institution to National Academy in 1916. Due to continuous growth of the academy, liberal arts courses were offered.

After 21 years of service in the field of education, the Board of Trustees applied for university status to the Department of Public Instruction. Thus the school became known as National University on June 17, 1921. The university installed, on that same day, Senator Camilo Osías, a Filipino educator, as the first President of the university. The Colleges of Education and Commerce were opened in the same year. During the following years, the Colleges of Pharmacy and Dentistry were opened in 1922. The College of Engineering, initially offering Civil Engineering opened in 1925, and the Normal School in 1930. Sanitary Engineering was offered in 1930. Bachelor's degrees in Chemical, Electrical, Industrial, Mechanical Engineering and Architecture and Arts were opened. Master in Sanitary Engineering was also organized. Computer Science was opened in 1990, Marine Engineering, Computer Engineering and Electronics and Communications Engineering in 1994. College of Nursing was offered in 2004, Hotel and Restaurant Management in 2008 and Information Technology in 2009.

A fire broke out on January 1, 1998, and razed four buildings of the university which are the old Main Building, Law and Commerce Building, Elementary Building, and Graduate School Building. The university was able to re-open its doors after three weeks of restoration work and used Mariano F. Jhocson Memorial Building The College of Dentistry Building, built in the 1920s, was the only building in the NU campus that remained unscathed in the fire.

In 2008, the SM Group of Companies acquired majority ownership of the National University.

A new logo of the National University was unveiled on October 17, 2017. The new brand features the school's colors and a shield which was inspired from the old university logo.

As the institution grows so as their demand for a bigger campus increases which led to the birth NU Main Building Expansion. The expansion is built to cater approximately 10,000 students in the coming years. The expansion will be a 12-storey building which is physically connected to the existing 8-storey building. The whole development will have a gross floor area of approximately 40,000sm. Additional facilities will be an indoor swimming pool, indoor futsal, basketball court, pe center, and fitness room.

Academics 
National University Manila offers twenty-four undergraduate degrees in its eight colleges. It also offers basic education via the NU Nazareth School. National University's basic education unit and Nazareth School merged in 2013. During the 2020–2021 school year, NU Nazareth had a student population of 13,729.

Campuses

Laguna Campus 

National University has a satellite campus in Calamba, Laguna. The abandoned site of St. James College of Calamba was purchased by NU and it is now occupied by National University as a satellite campus. It is the first NU campus outside Metro Manila. The university opened its doors to students in the 2018–2019 school year.

List of campuses

Accreditations and affiliations 
National University is an accredited member of various National and International Organizations:

 Association of Southeast Asian Institutions of Higher Learning (ASAIHL)
 International Association of Universities (IAU)
 Philippine Association of Colleges and Universities (PACU)
 Philippine Association of Colleges and Universities Commission on Accreditation (PACUCOA)
 University Athletic Association of the Philippines (UAAP)

Athletics

NU Bulldogs
National University was one of the schools that founded the Philippine National Collegiate Athletic Association (NCAA) in 1924. It was one of the three schools that left the NCAA in 1932 and formed a new athletic association named the University Athletic Association of the Philippines (UAAP) in 1938.

In the UAAP, NU has teams participating in twelve sports out of fifteen, namely; cheerleading, basketball, indoor volleyball, beach volleyball, football, baseball, softball, tennis, table tennis, badminton, fencing, taekwondo and chess.

The university's collegiate men's and women's varsity teams are called the National University Bulldogs and the Lady Bulldogs, respectively. The high school varsity teams are called the Bullpups and Lady Bullpups.

Notable alumni

Government and public service 
Fidel V. Ramos - 12th President of the Philippines, Chief of Staff - Armed Forces of the Philippines, professional soldier, and 8th placer in the Civil Engineering Licensure Examination in 1953.
Carlos P. Garcia - 8th President of the Philippines, lawyer, teacher, and poet. Bachelor of Laws (Philippine Law School), Doctor of Humanities (Honoris Causa) National University in 1961.
Rafael P. Nantes - Licensed Mechanical Engineer, businessman, three-term Congressman, and former Governor of Quezon
Roy Cimatu - Retired Philippine Army general serving as the Secretary of Environment and Natural Resources since 2017 in the Cabinet of President Rodrigo Duterte. Former Chief of Staff of the Armed Forces of the Philippines from May to September 2002 under President Gloria Macapagal Arroyo. Appointed by President Gloria Macapagal Arroyo as the Special Envoy to the Middle East during the Iraq War
Nicanor Faeldon - Former Jail Director-General of Bureau of Jail and Penology, Deputy Administrator III at the Office of Civil Defense (OCD), Former Commissioner of the Bureau of Customs, retired Philippine Marines Captain, and one of the leaders of the Oakwood mutiny that exposed corruption in the Philippine military. He is an awardee of a Gold Cross Medal, three Military Merit Medals (MMM), five Military Commendation Medal (MCM), a wounded personnel medal, and Luzon, Visayas, and Mindanao campaign medals.
Bernardo M. Vergara - Congressman and former mayor of Baguio City
Elisa Rosales Ochoa - The first woman elected to the Philippine Congress
Mamintal Adiong, Sr. - Civil and Sanitary engineer, former Governor of Lanao del Sur, former Deputy Minister of Public Works and Highways, former DPWH Undersecretary, former supervisor of Marawi Waterworks District, and a former international contractor in the Kingdom of Saudi Arabia
 Mamintal Alonto Adiong Jr.  - Civil Engineer, Governor of Lanao del Sur
Neptali Gonzales, Sr. - Graduated class valedictorian in the Philippine Law School. He placed ninth in the 1949 bar examinations with a grade of 92.50%. Vice-Governor of the Premier Province of Rizal (1967–1969), Congressman of the First District of Rizal (1969–1973). Assemblyman for the District of Mandaluyong-San Juan (1984–1986) and Senator for two consecutive terms (1987–1998). Before his election as Senator, he was appointed Minister and later Secretary of Justice (1986–1987)
Nemesio Yabut - Former Mayor of Makati from 1972 to 1986, Chairman of the Philippine Racing Commission from 1978 to 1986, played for the National University Bulldogs basketball team.

Literature 
Nestor Vicente Madali Gonzalez - National Artist of the Philippines for Literature

Media 
Joey de Leon - actor, TV host and comedian
Alice Doria-Gamilla - Composer of "A Million Thanks to You" using her original piano arrangement in 1960. The song was later on recorded by "Asia's Queen of Songs", Pilita Corrales which hit the millionth mark in sales which was a first in the Philippine recording history.
Jestoni Alarcon (NU High School) - actor
Roxlee (B.S. Arch) - Filipino animator, filmmaker, cartoonist (creator of Cesar Asar) and painter.

Sports 
Danny Ildefonso - Professional basketball player, two-time PBA Most Valuable Player and three-time PBA Finals Most Valuable Player awardee
Lordy Tugade - Professional basketball player
Carlos Loyzaga (NU High School) - basketball player and former Olympian
Narciso Bernardo - basketball player and former Olympian
Jun Papa -  Filipino basketball player, played for the NU Bulldogs in the University Athletic Association of the Philippines, Ysmael Steel Admirals and the Crispa-Floro Redmanizers in the Manila Industrial and Commercial Athletic Association and at the Summer Olympic Games in 1968 and 1972 as a member of the country's national basketball team.
Jefferson Napa -  Former basketball player and current head coach of the men's basketball team
Froilan Baguion - Professional basketball player
Jonathan Fernandez - Professional basketball player
Bobby Ray Parks Jr. - Most Valuable Player for UAAP Season 74 and 75
Troy Rosario - Professional basketball player
Glenn Khobuntin - Professional basketball player
Jewel Ponferada - Professional basketball player
Aleona Denise Santiago-Manabat - Volleyball Player
Alyja Daphne Santiago - Volleyball Player
Myla Pablo - Volleyball Player, Shakey's V-League finals MVP
Jennylyn Reyes - Volleyball Player, Best Libero in the 2015 Philippine Super Liga All-Filipino
Tin Patrimonio - Tennis player, model, actress and a former reality show contestant
Dave Wilson Yu - Basketball player, UAAP Champion Season 77, Licensed Civil Engineer

References

External links
 

 
Educational institutions established in 1900
Universities and colleges in Manila
Nursing schools in the Philippines
Dental schools in the Philippines
Education in Sampaloc, Manila
University Athletic Association of the Philippines universities
1900 establishments in the Philippines